Frank Casey was an American Negro league pitcher in the 1910s.

Casey played for the West Baden Sprudels in 1915. In six recorded appearances on the mound, he posted a 3.30 ERA over 46.1 innings.

References

External links
Baseball statistics and player information from Baseball-Reference Black Baseball Stats and Seamheads

Year of birth missing
Year of death missing
Place of birth missing
Place of death missing
West Baden Sprudels players
Baseball pitchers